Young Americans is an album by David Bowie.

Young Americans or The Young Americans may also refer to:

 "Young Americans" (song), the title track from the album
 The Young Americans, a show choir

Film and TV
 Young Americans (TV series), an American television drama
 Young Americans (1967 film), a documentary  about the choir
 Take Me Home Tonight, originally titled Young Americans
 The Young Americans (film), a 1993 crime drama
 The Young Americans, a forthcoming documentary about the Iraq War by Patrick Dollard

See also
 Young Americans Bank, a financial institution designed specifically for people under the age of twenty-two
 Young Americans for Freedom, a conservative youth organization